The Independent Socialist Party (ISP) was a political party in the UK. It was formed in 1934 as a breakaway from the Independent Labour Party (ILP) in protest at the increasing power of the Revolutionary Policy Committee within the ILP.

The ISP was led by Elijah Sandham, a former ILP MP who had been Chairman of the Lancashire Division of the ILP, and Tom Abbott, former Lancashire organiser for the party. The Lancashire ILP newspaper Labour's Northern Voice also supported the ISP. Outside Lancashire, the ISP was supported by the literary critic John Middleton Murry and his Adelphi magazine - and a small ISP based community was founded around his East Anglian home to show socialism as a living entity.

The ISP was socialist and resolutely anti-war, but was firmly anti-communist.

It failed to gain substantial support after its formation.  Several branches rejoined the ILP during World War II, and, following the deaths of its founders (in 1944 and 1949) the party wound itself up in the early 1950s.

References
Gidon Cohen (2003) The Independent Socialist Party in Gildart, Howell and Kirk (eds) Dictionary of Labour Biography

Political parties established in 1934
1934 establishments in the United Kingdom
1950s disestablishments in the United Kingdom
Political parties disestablished in the 1950s
Defunct socialist parties in the United Kingdom